Hillary du Cros is an Australian archaeologist and  cultural tourism teacher in Hong Kong and Macau. She is currently Associate Professor, Hong Kong Institute of Education, teaching in the area of Cultural Tourism in the Department of Cultural and Creative Arts. She has made significant contributions to the challenge of developing cultural heritage sites, including in various journals and full-length books.

Education

She completed a Phd at Monash University in 1996 on the topic Committing archaeology in Australia, which was published as Much More than Stones & Bones: Australian Archaeology in the Late Twentieth Century in 2002. Du Cros had begun her higher education in Australia, earning a BA from the University of Sydney.

Career

du Cros worked as an archaeologist and cultural heritage consultant from 1984 to 1998, operating her own consultancy firm from 1991-8, 'du Cros & Associates'  in Melbourne, Australia. In 1998 she sold her consulting business to Biosis Research and moved to Hong Kong.

She was appointed Senior Research Coordinator for the UNESCO Observatory for Research in Local Cultures and Creativity in Education from 2011-2015 and has published in Annals of Tourism Research, Journal of Sustainable Tourism, Historic Environment, and the Journal of Heritage Tourism, as well as a number of books.

Publications

 Much More than Stones & Bones: Australian Archaeology in the Late Twentieth Century, Melbourne University Press. 2002 
 Cultural tourism : the partnership between tourism and cultural heritage management, with Bob McKercher,  Routledge, 2002 
 Cultural Heritage Management in China: Preserving the Cities of the Pearl River Delta, with Yok-shiu F. Lee,UK: Routledge, 2007, 0415397197
 World Heritage-Themed Souvenirs for Asian Tourists: A case study from Macau. In Cave, J. (ed.) Tourism and Souvenirs: Global Perspectives from the Margins. London, Channel View Publications:176-189. 2013.
 The Arts and Events (with Lee Jolliffe) 2014
 Cultural Tourism (with Bob McKercher) 2014.

References

Australian archaeologists
Living people
Monash University alumni
Tourism researchers
Australian women archaeologists
Year of birth missing (living people)